Holy Trinity Catholic Secondary School is a Catholic high school in Cornwall, Ontario, Canada. The current principal is Dawn Finnegan. Wearing school uniforms during school hours is mandatory, as in most Catholic schools. The school allows attendance of Catholic and non-Catholic students to take part in an advanced learning institution. It currently enrolls 516 students as of 2020.

Sports
The secondary school is represented in many different intramural sports offered in Grade 7-12 as the “Holy Trinity Falcons.”

Sports include: soccer, rugby, track and field, badminton, golf, basketball, hockey, tennis, volleyball, cross-country, and football.

See also
List of high schools in Ontario

External links
 Holy Trinity Catholic Secondary School
 Catholic District School Board of Eastern Ontario

High schools in Cornwall, Ontario
Catholic secondary schools in Ontario
Educational institutions established in 2004
2004 establishments in Ontario